The 1978 Pacific Tigers football team represented the University of the Pacific (UOP) in the 1978 NCAA Division I-A football season as a member of the Pacific Coast Athletic Association.

The team was led by head coach Chester Caddas, in his seventh year, and played their home games at Pacific Memorial Stadium in Stockton, California. They finished the season with a record of four wins and eight losses (4–8, 3–2 PCAA). The Tigers were outscored by their opponents 222–306 over the season.

Schedule

Notes

References

Pacific
Pacific Tigers football seasons
Pacific Tigers football